Nancy Condee is a professor at the University of Pittsburgh in the Department of Slavic Languages and Literatures and served as the head of the Cultural Studies department from 1995 to 2006. Her field is contemporary Russian cinema and cultural politics.

Life and work
Condee received her Ph.D. at Yale University.

She is co-organizer, with Vladimir Padunov, of the Pittsburgh Film Symposium, held each year in May at the University of Pittsburgh.  Her most recent book, The Imperial Trace: Recent Russian Cinema, won the Society for Cinema and Media Studies' Katherine Singer Kovács Book Award.  The book, published by Oxford University Press, focuses on contemporary Russian cinema.

Awards
 2011 - Modern Language Association (MLA) Aldo and Jeanne Scaglione Prize for Studies in Slavic Languages and Literatures
 2010 - Annual research prize from the Society for Cinema and Media Studies (Katherine Singer Kovács Book Award)
 2007-2009 - Appointment to Oxford University (New College) Research Network: Russian National Identity Since 1961: Traditions and Deterritorialisation. Multi-year international research network funded by the Arts and Humanities Research Council (UK)
 2004 - British Academy Visiting Fellow: Oxford University (St. Antony's College)
 2000-2002 - Ford Foundation Grant on Globalization and Popular Culture

Bibliography
 Antinomies of Art and Culture: Modernity, Postmodernity, Contemporaneity, ed. with Terry Smith and Okwui Enwezor (Duke University Press, 2008);
 Imperial Trace: Recent Russian Cinema (Oxford University Press, 2009); 
 The Cinema of Alexander Sokurov, ed. with Birgit Beumers (I.B. Tauris, 2011).

References

Links
 Nancy Condee at GoogleScholar

Linguists from the United States
Living people
Year of birth missing (living people)
University of Pittsburgh faculty
Women linguists